Renate Roider (born 22 December 1971) is an Austrian cross-country skier. She competed in two events at the 1998 Winter Olympics.

Cross-country skiing results
All results are sourced from the International Ski Federation (FIS).

Olympic Games

World Championships

World Cup

Season standings

References

External links
 

1971 births
Living people
Austrian female cross-country skiers
Olympic cross-country skiers of Austria
Cross-country skiers at the 1998 Winter Olympics
Sportspeople from Salzburg
20th-century Austrian women